The M84 is the currently-issued stun grenade ("flashbang") of the United States Armed Forces and SWAT teams throughout the United States. Upon detonation, it emits an intensely loud "bang" of 170–180 decibels and a blinding flash of more than one million candela within  of initiation, sufficient to cause immediate flash blindness, deafness, tinnitus, and inner ear disturbance. Exposed personnel experience disorientation, confusion and loss of coordination and balance. While these effects are all intended to be temporary, there is risk of permanent injury. Consequently, the M84 is classified as a less-lethal weapon.

Design

The M84 features a magnesium-based pyrotechnic charge inside a thin aluminum case, contained within a perforated cast steel body. Unlike the high explosives (HE) used in traditional ordnance, the pyrotechnic charge produces a subsonic deflagration, not a supersonic detonation, minimizing the blast effects. On initiation the auditory and visual elements of the deflagration being permitted to escape via the perforations in the cast outer body. This design minimizes the risk of collateral damage due to flame, blast and unconsumed fragments of the inner case.

It is intended to be thrown into enclosed spaces to distract and temporarily incapacitate enemy personnel for easier capture, or when risk of collateral damage during urban warfare or hostage rescue operations contravenes the employment of traditionally lethal and destructive fragmenting high explosive ordnance. US Army doctrine calls for the M84 to be deployed "during building and room clearing operations, when the presence of noncombatants is likely or expected and the assault element is attempting to achieve surprise."

While the M84 is generally incapable of igniting paper or cloth, it can still ignite extremely flammable liquids or vapors (such as concentrated gasoline or ether fumes) in the immediate area of the grenade.

See also
Hand grenade

References

Stun grenades
Hand grenades of the United States
Military equipment introduced in the 1990s